Division von Broich was a German provisional infantry division active in 1942–43 in North Africa. It was created in November 1942 and named after its notable commander Friedrich von Broich. In February 1943, the division was renamed Division von Manteuffel after its new commander, Generalmajor Hasso von Manteuffel.
Despite its makeshift nature, the unit proved itself as a capable force, taking part in numerous actions until forced to capitulate with the rest of Army Group Africa in May 1943.

Service history
The German action in Tunisia came in response to the Allied Landings in North Africa that took place 8 November 1942 and was intended to protect the Axis lines of communication.
The unit was created on 15 November 1942 by renaming the Schützen-Brigade (Rifle Brigade) von Broich, a provisional unit formed from Ortskommandeur II/960 on 10 November. The unit was specifically designed to command and control a variety of units flown in by the Germans to defend the Bizerte and Tunis Bridgeheads in Tunisia.

Although it was never given a formal organizational structure, it was quickly organized along the lines of a standard infantry division, but composed of a variety of German Fallschirmjäger (paratrooper) units, Tunis Field Battalions and Africa March (replacement) Battalions, as well as an Italian Bersaglieri Regiment. Virtually all of its artillery and logistics had to be improvised using a variety of German, Italian and captured Allied equipment. Though it was a makeshift force in all respects, it quickly proved itself as a capable force, especially in the hands of its highly talented commanders, scoring impressive German defensive victories at Mateur, Djedejda, Medjez el Bab and Sedjnane in November and December 1942.

On 7 February 1943, the division was renamed Division von Manteuffel after its new commander, Generalmajor Hasso von Manteuffel, succeeding Generalmajor von Broich, who had departed to take command of the 10th Panzer Division. As the German defensive campaign in Tunisia wore on into 1943, the division underwent several actions designed to bring its structure within the lines of a conventional infantry division, having two regiments being given formal numerical designations.

In the last battle of the campaign the Manteuffel Group was bypassed when the Allies broke through the northern front at Hill 609, 
and was forced to capitulate it ran out of fuel and ammunition near Bizerte on 9 May 1943.

Assessment
Throughout most of its short service, it defended the northern sector of the Tunisian Front, spanning the northern coast of Tunisia as far south as the town of Pont du Fahs. One of its regiments, Fallschirmjäger Regiment Barenthin, was called "perhaps the best German troops in Africa" by none other than General Harold Alexander, Commander of the Allied 18th Army Group.

Commanding officers
Generalmajor Friedrich Freiherr von Broich 15 November 1942 – 5 February 1943
Generalmajor Hasso von Manteuffel 7 February 1943 – 31 March 1943
Generalleutnant Karl Bülowius 31 March - 9 May 1943

General Staff Officers
Ia - Hauptmann Prahst, Major Ulrich Boes
Ib - Hauptmann Rudolf Beck
Ic - Leutnant Habedank, Oberleutnant Ernst Sont
IIa - Hauptmann Selig, Hauptmann Gustav Felix
IIb - Leutnant Felix Monka
01 - Oberleutnant Ernst Sont, Leutnant Walter Schwaegermann
O2 - Oberleutnant Karl Schleiermacher
IVa - Stabsintendant Gerhardt Pischottka
IVb - Oberfeldartzt Hermann Dr. Gottesbueren
Vk - Major (Ing) Hermann Schmidt
WuG - Oberleutnant Guenther Schreiber
Nachr.Offz - Oberleutnant Herbert Funk

Order of Battle (30 January 1943)
 Division Headquarters
 Fallschirmjäger Regiment (motorized) "Barenthin" (Luftwaffe)
 Tunis Field Battalion T3
 4th and 12th Batteries, Artillery Regiment (motorized) 2
 4th Battery, Artillery Regiment 190
 Panzerjäger (Antitank) Battalion 605
 Reconnaissance Company
 Fallschirmjäger Pionier Battalion (motorized) 11 (Luftwaffe)
 Panzer Communications Platoon (motorized) 190
 Bersaglieri Regiment 10 (Italian)
 Maintenance Platoon (motorized) 215
 Division Rations Office

Order of Battle (18 March 1943)

 Division Headquarters
 Fallschirmjäger Regiment (motorized) "Barenthin" (Luftwaffe)
 Tunis Field Battalion T3
 Africa March Battalion A30
 4th Battalion, Artillery Regiment (motorized) 2
 Flak Battlegroup (Luftwaffe)
 Fallschirmjäger Pionier Battalion (motorized) 11 (Luftwaffe)
 Panzer Communications Platoon (motorized) 190
 Bersaglieri Regiment 10 (Italian)
 Transportation Battalion "Weber"
 Maintenance Company (motorized) 215
 Medical Company (motorized) "Burgass"
 Division Rations Office
 Division Field Post Office

Order of Battle (23 March 1943) 

 Division Headquarters
 Fallschirmjäger Regiment (motorized) "Barenthin" (Luftwaffe) with:
 I - III Battalions
 Panzergrenadier Regiment 160 (aka Kampfgruppe Ballerstedt) with:
 Tunis Field Battalion T3
 Tunis Field Battalion T4
 Africa March Battalion A30
 Bersaglieri Regiment 10 (Italian) with:
 XVI Bersaglieri Battalion
 XXXIV Bersaglieri Battalion
 LXIII Bersaglieri Battalion
 IV Battalion, Artillery Regiment (motorized) 2 with:
 10th Battery, Artillery Regiment 2
 11th Battery, Artillery Regiment 2
 12th Battery, Artillery Regiment 2
 4th Battery, Artillery Regiment 190
 Fallschirmjäger Pionier Battalion (motorized) 11 (Luftwaffe)
 Flak Battlegroup (Luftwaffe)
 Panzer Communications Platoon (motorized) 190
 Medical Company "Burgass"
 Heavy Truck Column "Weber"
 Maintenance Platoon (motorized) 215
 Division Rations Office

See also 
 Division (military), Military unit, List of German divisions in World War II
 Heer, Wehrmacht
 Fifth Panzer Army
 Panzer Army Africa, Wehrmacht
 Army Group Africa, Wehrmacht
 Hasso von Manteuffel

References 
 Bender, Roger James and Law, Richard D: Uniforms, Organization and History of the Afrikakorps. (Mountain View, CA: R. James Bender Publishing, 1973).
 Tessin, Georg: Verbände und Truppen der deutschen Wehrmacht und Waffen-SS 1939 - 1945, Vol. 14. (Osnabrueck, Germany: Biblio Verlag, 1980).
 Alexander, Viscount H. R.: "The African Campaign from El Alamein to Tunis from 10th August 1942 to 13th May 1943," Supplement to The London Gazette, 5 February 1948. (London: The London Gazette, 1948).
 1a Kriegstagebuch, Division von Broich/von Manteuffel 11 Nov. 1942 – 31 Jan. 1943.
 1a Kriegstagebuch, XC Korps, 16 Nov. - 7 Dec. 1942.
 Schlacht und Gefechtskalender 1943 Oberkommando des Heeres (OKH) Heeres-Verordnungsblatt (H.V.) 1943.

Infantry divisions of Germany during World War II
Military units and formations established in 1942
German units in Africa
Military units and formations disestablished in 1943